Trifolium cyathiferum is a species of clover known by the common names cup clover and bowl clover.

Distribution
This species occurs in western North America, its distribution extending from Alaska and the Yukon, through the Pacific Northwest to California, Utah, and Montana. As an example occurrence, it is found in the California Coast Ranges in such places as Ring Mountain, California, where it is found in association with tomcat clover.

It usually occurs in spring-moist valleys, chaparral, and forest habitats, below  in elevation.

Description
Trifolium cyathiferum is a low growing annual plant.

The inflorescence is many flowered and bowl shaped. Flowers are white to yellow with pink tips. The bloom period is May to August.

References

External links
Calflora Database: Trifolium cyathiferum (Bowl clover, Cup clover)
 Jepson Manual eFlora (TJM2) treatment of Trifolium cyathiferum
USDA Plants Profile for Trifolium cyathiferum (cup clover)
University of Washington Burke Museum
UC CalPhotos gallery: Trifolium cyathiferum

cyathiferum
Flora of the Northwestern United States
Flora of Western Canada
Flora of Alaska
Flora of California
Flora of Nevada
Plants described in 1827